Pantera Capital is an American hedge fund that specializes in cryptocurrencies. It is the largest crypto hedge fund in the world by AUM. 

The firm was founded in 2003 by Dan Morehead (ex Tiger Management) and is co-managed by Co-CIO Joey Krug, the founder of the first major Ethereum project, Augur. 

In 2013, it launched the first investment fund focused on Bitcoin in the United States.

See also
Economics of bitcoin
Alternative investment

References 

Hedge funds
Hedge fund firms of the United States
Companies based in Menlo Park, California
American companies established in 2003
Tiger Management